Flor Alpaerts (Antwerp, 12 September 1876 – Antwerp, 5 October 1954) was a Belgian conductor, pedagogue and composer. He graduated from the Vlaamse Muziekschool in 1901.

He was artistic director of the Peter Benoit Foundation, co-director of the Royal Flemish Opera and a member of the Royal Academy of Belgium. As a composer he became the leading Flemish impressionist, with the symphonic poem Pallieter (1921-1924).

Alpaerts left behind an extensive body of work. He first composed in an impressionist style, later expressionist, and finally neo-classical. He drew his inspiration from Flemish life. Peter Benoit was his great model, but he adapted Benoit's principles and gave Flemish music a modern mode of expression and a contemporary face.
He wrote above all for the symphony orchestra, but he also wrote incidental music, an opera, many Flemish songs, chamber music and work for brass bands and wind ensembles.

Notable students include the two composers, Denise Tolkowsky and Ernest Schuyten.

Works
 Psyché (1899), symphonic poem
 Herleving (1904)
 Cyrus (1905) inspired by a work by Louis Couperus
 Lentesymfonie (1906)
 Pallieter (1921), symphonic poem
 Benedictus Deus (1926) for mixed choir
 Tijl Uilenspiegel (1927), symphonic poem
 James Ensor-suite (1931), considered his masterpiece
 Salome's dans van de zeven sluiers (Salome's dance of the seven veils)
 Shylock, opera in three acts (1910-1913)

Sources
 Flor Alpaerts at CeBeDeM

External links
 Koninklijk Conservatorium Brussel now houses most works and manuscripts of Alpaerts, after the bankruptcy of CeBeDeM in 2015.
 
 Biography of Flor Alpaerts on SVM

1876 births
1954 deaths
19th-century classical composers
19th-century Belgian male musicians
20th-century classical composers
20th-century Belgian male musicians
Belgian classical composers
Belgian male classical composers
Flemish composers
Musicians from Antwerp